Heritage School, Cambridge is a  mixed private day school for pupils aged 4–16, located in Cambridge in the English county of Cambridgeshire.  The school is housed in three Victorian Buildings within walking distance of Cambridge City Centre, close to the University Botanic Garden, with sports facilities a short distance away.  There are approximately 180 pupils, class sizes are small with 16 pupils per class in the Junior school and 18 pupils per class in the Senior school.

Heritage School has been influenced by the philosophy and practice of noteworthy Victorian educationalist Charlotte Mason the founder of the PNEU movement at the end of the 19th century.

History
Heritage School, Cambridge was founded as a preparatory school in 2007 by Jason Fletcher (Headmaster) and Fiona Fletcher (Director of Studies). They started with 16 pupils and 6 members of staff subletting premises from Sancton Wood School at 19 Brookside.  In 2010  swelling numbers necessitated expansion into 18 Brookside.  In 2011 the school opened their Senior School and the school now holds an independent lease on 17-19 Brookside having undertaken considerable development work to the interior of the building and to the playground and carpark to the rear of the building.

Exam Results
18 pupils sat IGCSEs and GCSEs in 2022.

47% of all results were awarded 9

73% of all results were awarded 9 - 8

82% of all results were awarded 9 - 7

91% of all results were awarded 9 - 6

3 pupils received all 9s in 9 or more subjects, with 1 pupil achieving 12 9s

70% of all grades were above what standardised tests predicted to be 'most likely'

Principles
Heritage School, Cambridge states that the school’s Christian ethos lies at the heart of their educational philosophy.  Christian beliefs and values are explored in assemblies. Short Scripture readings start the day (a few days a week) to reference both the school’s ethos and cultural heritage. Heritage School welcomes pupils from all backgrounds; the school has numerous American expatriate students

References

External links
Heritage School official website

Private schools in Cambridgeshire
Educational institutions established in 2007
2007 establishments in England
Schools in Cambridge